The following lists events that happened during 2002 in Singapore.

Incumbents
President: S.R. Nathan
Prime Minister: Goh Chok Tong

Events

January
1 January – Re-registration for NRICs will be required if anyone turns 30 and above on or after today.
2 January – City Gas is formed from PowerGas.
5 January – The National Science and Technology Board is renamed to the Agency for Science, Technology and Research (A*Star).
9 January – 
A Passenger Security Service Charge will be introduced for passengers who use Changi Airport from 1 March. This is so as to cover security costs incurred in the wake of the 9/11 attacks. In addition, Changi Airport will upgrade Terminal 2 for S$200 million.
11 January – The new building housing the Family and Juvenile Court is officially opened, having been brought together in September 2001.
12 January – MediaCorp channel CityTV ceases transmission after two years due to lack of viewership and poor economic climate.
13 January – Singapore and Japan signed the Japan–Singapore Economic Agreement for a New Age Partnership, making it Singapore's first free-trade agreement FTA with a major trading partner.
14 January – Reclamation works around Chek Jawa area will be deferred as long as development works are not required, with plans made to conserve the island instead.
25 January – 
Osim's new headquarters is officially opened.
 Three statutory boards under Ministry of Trade and Industry are renamed to International Enterprise Singapore, SPRING Singapore and Agency for Science, Technology and Research respectively to deal with a changing economy.

February

8 February – 
Changi Airport MRT station is opened for revenue service.
The SAF's new clubhouse, The Chevrons is officially opened.
Singapore's first elected President Ong Teng Cheong dies from lymphoma cancer at 8:14pm.
9 February – 
Jack Neo's I Not Stupid is released. The film triggered a discussion on education streaming, which led to the merging of EM1 and EM2 streams in 2004, with abolishment of EM3 streams by 2008.
The Opera Estate Drainage Scheme is completed, having a storage tank during rains.
11 February – The Singapore flags flew at half mast as a mark of respect to mourn the passing of the nation's first elected President Ong Teng Cheong, who died from lymphoma cancer three days earlier at 8:14pm. It was considered very inauspicious by Chinese people since it coincided with Chinese New Year's Eve.
16 February – The Upper Serangoon Viaduct is opened.
25 February – Keppel TatLee Bank merges into OCBC Bank.
27 February – During the official opening of the Changi Airport line, 15 out of 16 stations along the North East MRT line (including Potong Pasir and Punggol) will open after a review, leaving Woodleigh closed.
28 February – Construction starts on National Trades Union Congress's new building, with completion by 2004.

March
1 March – 
The prefix '6' is added to all landline phones.
The Changi Business Aviation Centre is opened for business travellers who fly via executive jets. Plans are announced to strengthen the aviation industry, including a future dedicated Business Aviation Centre in Changi Airport subject to demand and research and development projects via AIRport Systems Technology, Research, and Innovation Platform (AIRSTRIP).
3 March – TV Works is renamed to Channel i.
5 March – Construction of the five-stage Circle MRT line starts, spanning  orbitally. The first two stages are scheduled for completion by 2006 with the rest by 2010.
8 March – Singapore Press Holdings's new headquarters (named 'News Centre' on 11 November) is officially opened.
16 March – Raffles Hospital is officially opened.
20 March – PSA Corporation acquires logistics company CWT.
27 March – Singapore Management University's new campus starts construction. Targets for primary cohort in universities will be raised from 21 percent now to 25 percent in 2010.

April
1 April – 
The Board of Commissioners of Currency, Singapore stops issuing 1-cent coins.
The Singapore Business Federation is launched to represent businesses in Singapore.
10 April – The Singapore Tyler Print Institute (now STPI - Creative Workshop & Gallery) is officially opened in Clarke Quay.
13 April – A contact-based card system used for travel, EZ-Link, is launched for sale.
15 April – The Health Sciences Authority orders a stop on Slim 10 sales in a suit caused by one death and a high-profile liver failure case.
25 April – The Merlion is relocated to Merlion Park, 30 years since it first launched.

May
5 May – Khoo Swee Chiow reaches the North Pole, becoming the first Singaporean to do so. As a result, he conquered both the North Pole and the South Pole.
15 May – StarHub and Singapore Cable Vision agree to merge with the new entity starting operations on 1 October.
19 May – The Toa Payoh Bus Interchange opens, the first air-conditioned interchange.

June
June – Zhenghua Nature Park is completed. 
1 June – SIA's SpaceBed is launched to enhance travellers' comfort.
16 June – The merger of Overseas Union Bank into United Overseas Bank is completed.

July 
1 July – The National Environment Agency is launched to tackle environmental issues. 
10–21 July – The 2002 ACC Trophy is held.

August
August – Compass Point Shopping Centre opens its doors. 
1 August – Republic Polytechnic is established, which teaches with Problem-Based Learning.
8 August – Soon Lee Bus Depot is officially opened as a new multi-storey depot. A second depot in Bedok is expected by 2004.
24 August – The Singapore Green Plan 2012 is launched.

September
 5 September – A new Automated People Mover system (now the Changi Airport Skytrain) is announced. The system will link all three terminals, which was completed in 2006.
 12 September – library@esplanade is opened in Esplanade as a performing arts library.
 15 September – The Merlion is reopened in the new Merlion Park.
 23 September – The Heritage Trees Scheme is officially launched to conserve trees of historical value, with some of them ranging 80 to 100 years old. An initial list of 36 trees has been drawn up.
 30 September – 
NRICs will not display blood types from today due to quick blood tests that can be obtained easily.
ElderShield is launched as an insurance plan for those with severe disabilities. It will pay S$300 over 5 years.

October

1 October – The Board of Commissioners of Currency, Singapore (BCCS) merges with Monetary Authority of Singapore (MAS), first announced on 1 March.
11 October – Virgin Mobile Singapore ceases operations as a mobile virtual network operator after gaining just 3% of the mobile market in Singapore.
12 October – The Esplanade is officially opened by President S. R. Nathan.

November
 2 November – After several accidents and two deaths, Fantasy Island in Sentosa is closed.
 11 November – The Kallang Paya Lebar Expressway is officially launched, with the  expressway scheduled by 2007.
 20 November – A large Chengal Pasir tree was felled by DTZ Debenham Tie Leung. After a court hearing, it was fined in 2003.
 21 November – Comfort Group and DelGro Corporation announced a merger between the biggest taxi operator and the largest public bus operator in Singapore respectively, creating a S$1 billion company. The merger results in the formation of ComfortDelGro Corporation on 29 March 2003.

December 
1 December – Magnetic-stripe cards for use on Singapore's public transport system are completely phased out, completing the switchover to EZ-Link cards.
5 December – A gender-quota for admission of medical school students will be abolished from the 2003 batch, allowing men and women to pursue medicine as they wish. 
21 December – The Ministry of Home Affairs and Ministry of Transport announced that an air marshals unit will be stationed in Singapore Airlines and SilkAir for security, with the first stationed in 2003.
27 December – Two police officers, on normal supervisory rounds from the Changi Neighbourhood Police Centre of Bedok division were killed when their patrol car was overrun from the rear by a large garbage truck along Tanah Merah Ferry Road.
30 December – The Integrated Programme is announced, allowing students to proceed directly to Junior Colleges without taking the O Level exams. The scheme takes its first students in 2004.

Deaths
8 February – Ong Teng Cheong, former president of Singapore (b. 1936).
23 April – Gopal Baratham, neurosurgeon, writer (b. 1935).
18 July – Lee Siew Choh, former Barisan Sosialis leader and first Non-Constituency Member of Parliament (NCMP) (b. 1917).
27 August – Brother Joseph McNally, arts pioneer, founder of LASALLE College of the Arts (b. 1923).
10 September – Kuo Pao Kun, theatre director (b. 1939).
 Low Ing Sing, Mandarin drama and theatre pioneer (b. 1924).

References

 
Years of the 21st century in Singapore
Singapore
Singapore
2000s in Singapore